Lieve Wierinck (born 3 July 1957 in Leuven) is a Belgian politician who served as Member of the European Parliament (MEP) for the Open Flemish Liberals and Democrats (Open Vld), which sits in the ALDE Group, from 2016 until 2019. She succeeded Philippe De Backer, who became Secretary of State in the Michel Government.

In the European Parliament, Wierinck was member of the Committee on Industry, Research and Energy (ITRE) and of the delegation for relations with the People's Republic of China. In 2019, Wierinick was the recipient of the Health Award at The Parliament Magazine's annual MEP Awards.

Wierinck was member of the Belgian Chamber of Representatives from 2011 to 2014. She is also active in local politics in Zaventem and has been chairwoman of the national VLD Women since 2015.

References

1957 births
Living people
Politicians from Leuven
Open Vlaamse Liberalen en Democraten MEPs
MEPs for Belgium 2014–2019